Russ Ball  is an American football executive who is the executive vice president/director of football operations for the Green Bay Packers of the National Football League (NFL). He joined the team in 2008 and served as the vice president of football administration/player finance before being promoted to executive vice president/director of football operations in 2018.

Biography
Born in Moberly, Missouri, Ball is a graduate of the University of Central Missouri and the University of Missouri. He is married to Diana and has two children.

Career
During college, Ball played center with the Central Missouri Mules football team. Later Ball served as head strength and conditioning coach for the Missouri Tigers football team from 1982 to 1989. From there he spent ten seasons with the National Football League's Kansas City Chiefs, first serving as assistant strength and conditioning coach, and later as the administrative assistant to the head coach. In 1999, he became the senior football administrator for the Minnesota Vikings. He became  the director of football administration for the Washington Redskins in 2001. From 2002 to 2007 he worked with the New Orleans Saints, first as their senior football administrator, later as vice president of football administration. He was hired by the Green Bay Packers on February 14, 2008, as their vice president of football administration/player finance. He was promoted to executive vice president/director of football operations on January 8, 2018.

References

People from Randolph County, Missouri
Green Bay Packers executives
New Orleans Saints executives
Washington Redskins executives
Minnesota Vikings executives
Kansas City Chiefs executives
Kansas City Chiefs coaches
Missouri Tigers football coaches
Central Missouri Mules football players
University of Missouri alumni
Living people
People from Moberly, Missouri
Players of American football from Missouri
1959 births